The thirteenth season of the Dutch TV series Wie is de Mol? ("Who is the Mole?") aired in the winter of 2013. Season 11 winner, Art Rooijakkers returned to host for his second season. The season took place in South Africa, marking the first time the series has filmed in an African country. The season premiered on January 3, 2013. The Reunion aired on March 7, 2013 where  was declared the winner of the season, earning a grand total of €17,120.-. Cornelisse, alongside her runner-up , had successfully unmasked Kees Tol as the Mole of 2013.

Format
Followed the same format as its Belgian predecessor, ten Dutch celebrities travel to South Africa to complete Assignments to earn money for the group pot. However, one of the ten is the titular Mole (de Mol), the one designated to sabotage the assignments and cause the group to earn the least amount of money for the winner's pot as possible. Every few days, players would take a 20-question multiple choice test about the identity of the Mole. Once the test is complete, the candidates await their results in an Execution ceremony. The candidate with the worst score is executed from the game, while in the event of the tie the candidate who completed their test the slowest is executed. The season plays out until there are three remaining candidates, where they must complete a final test (consisting of 40 questions). The candidate with the highest score, or had completed their test the fastest in a tie, is declared the winner and receives the group's pot.

Candidates

Candidates Progress

 The candidate is the winner of Wie is de Mol 2013.
 The candidate was unmasked as The Mole 2013.
 The candidate was the losing finalist of Wie is de Mol 2013.
 The candidate saw a Green Screen to proceeded to the next Episode.
 The candidate used an Exemption to automatically proceed to the next Episode.
 The candidate used Jokers for this test, and saw a Green Screen to proceed to the next Episode.
 The candidate used Jokers for this test, however, they did not see a Green Screen before the Executed player saw their Red Screen. Thus they proceeded to the next Episode.
 The candidate did not see a Green Screen before the Executed player saw their Red Screen. Thus they proceeded to the next Episode.
 The candidate was executed from the game and sent home.
 The candidate was medically evacuated from the game due to a severe injury on production.
Notes

Episodes
For more information, see: List of seasons of "Wie is de Mol?" (in Dutch)

Notes

Season Summary

Mole Sabotage

Hidden Clues

Viewing Figures

References

13
2013 Dutch television seasons
Television shows set in South Africa
Television shows filmed in South Africa